The Sahayak class of hopper barge is a pair of yardcraft built by Garden Reach Shipbuilders and Engineers Limited (GRSE), Kolkata for the Indian Navy.

See also
Nikaraksha-class bucket dredger

References

Auxiliary ships of the Indian Navy